Jolene Watanabe (August 31, 1968 – June 22, 2019) was an American international tennis player. She competed in the Australian Open 6 times, from 1994 to 2000. Jolene also competed in the French Open, Wimbledon, and the US Open making the second round in each of these tournaments. She obtained a career high singles ranking of 72 in 1997 and included a win over Jennifer Capriati. Jolene previously coached at the Van Der Meer Tennis Academy and most recently coached at Smith Stearns Tennis Academy serving as the Assistant Director. She coached numerous top players during her coaching career. As a junior Jolene played for the Southern California section. She attended the University of Nevada Las Vegas (UNLV) for her D1 collegiate tennis. She died from cancer of the appendix on June 22, 2019, on Hilton Head Island, South Carolina.

References

External links
 
 

1968 births
American female tennis players
2019 deaths
21st-century American women